Sachsia is a genus of nematodes in the family Diplogastridae.

References

Diplogastridae
Taxa described in 1960
Diplogasteria
Nematode genera